Benjamin Franklin Huffman (July 18, 1914 – February 22, 2005) was a catcher in Major League Baseball. He played for the St. Louis Browns in 1937.

References

External links

1914 births
2005 deaths
Major League Baseball catchers
St. Louis Browns players
Baseball players from Virginia
Chicago White Sox scouts
Minor league baseball managers
People from Page County, Virginia